General Haller may refer to:

Franz Haller (1796–1875), Hungarian Army lieutenant general
Józef Haller (1873–1960), Polish Army lieutenant general
Stanisław Haller (1872–1940), Polish Army general